Sat Paul Parashar is an Indian financial management expert and business education administrator. Dr Parashar has been member of the Boards of a number of corporations and management institutions. He has contributed to many business and management schools, corporates and banks in Asia and the Middle East, notably in India, Singapore, Nepal, the United Arab Emirates, Bahrain, Oman, and Qatar. He was appointed as director at the Indian Institutes of Management, Indore from 2004 to 2008. Currently, working as Independent Financial Services Professional, based out of Arizona, USA also Adjunct Faculty of Finance at Rady School of Management, University of California, USA.

Education 
Parashar holds an M.Com from Delhi School of Economics (1971) and obtained his PhD from the Faculty of Management Studies, University of Delhi (1981). His doctoral thesis was titled "Liquidity Management in Selected Indian Companies".

Career 
Parashar is head of the Banking Center at the Bahrain Institute of Banking and Finance (BIBF). Parashar was the head of the Research and Studies Department, Emirates Institute for Banking and Financial Studies, Sharjah, United Arab Emirates from 1999 to 2004. Parashar holds the IFCI Golden Jubilee Chair Professor of Finance at the Management Development Institute. Prior to this, he was associate professor of Finance at the Xavier Labor Relations Institute, Jamshedpur and faculty at the University of Delhi.

Awards 
Parashar was rated 'Academic Par Excellence' in 2003 at the Emirates Institute for Banking and Financial Studies. His interview was published in The Times of India (11 July 2005) and it was titled, 'A Jewel in the IIM Crown' highlighting his transformation and turnaround of IIM Indore in a short time frame.

Corporate positions 
Parashar has been appointed or nominated on the board of the following academic institutions and corporations for his expertise in the field of finance, management, and education administration:
Member, Board of directors, Power Finance Corporation Ltd., India
Member, Board of directors, Bharat Electronics Ltd., India.
Non-executive director, MP Power Transmission Company Ltd., India.
Member, Board of governors, School of Good Governance and Policy Analysis.
Member, Board of governors, Indian Institute of Management Indore.
Member, Board of governors, Institute of Finance and International Management, India.
Member, Board of governors, United States India Educational Foundation.
Member, Advisory Group, Human Development Report Committee, Government of Madhya Pradesh, 2005.
Member, High Power Committee for Faculty Development in Technical Institutions 2006, All India Council for Technical Education.
Special Invitee, Working Group, Oversight Committee, Planning Commission, Government of India.
Member, Executive Board, Association of Indian Management Schools, 2006–2007.
Advisory Board Member, Jaypee business school, NOIDA, India.
Member Academic Council, Sri Sharada Institute of Indian Management-Research, India.
Member, Board of directors, Pithampur Auto Cluster Ltd., New Delhi.
International Advisory Board, Association of Indian Management Scholars.
Academic advisory board, NIILM-Center for Management Studies.
Member, National advisory board, Khandelwal College of Management Science and Technology.

Publications 
He has published over 40 papers in academic journals and has authored or co-authored several books. He is a member of the editorial boards of the Indian Journal of Finance and Research, the Journal of the Indian Financial Management Association, and the International Journal of Business Competition and Growth.

Selected journal articles 

Adam J. Sulkowski, S P Parashar, and Lu Wei, Corporate Responsibility Reporting in China, India, Japan and the West: One Mantra Does Not Fit All, New England Law Review. Vol 42, 2008, pp 787–808.
S P Parashar and S. Venkataramanaiah. Operationalisation of an auto cluster project: Indian experience International Journal of Indian Culture and Business Management, Vol. 1, No. 4, 2008, pp 475–485.
S Venkataramanaiah and S P Parashar, Enhancing the competitiveness of SMEs through industrial clusters: The Indian experience', International Journal of Technology Management and Sustainable Development 6: 3, 2007, pp. 227–243.
S P Parashar, Winning over Equals: Insights from Bhagwad Geeta (Krishna-Arjuna Framework) International Journal of Indian Culture and Business Management, Vol. 1, No.3, 2008, pp. 354 – 359.
S P Parashar, Financial Management Practices in Selected Indian Companies, ICWAI Research Bulletin, Bi-annual Number of the Institute of Cost and Works Accountants of India, July–December,1999, Volume No. XVIII, PP 11–28
S P Parashar, Cost and Productivity of Capital in Indian Companies, Indian Management, Journal of the All India Management Association, May 1985, Volume 24, No.5, PP 30–34
Madhu Tyagi, S P Parashar, Financial Performance of Public Sector Tourism Companies, Journal of Management Development Institute, Jan–June, 1996
S P Parashar, Aftermath of Tondon Guidelines, Indian Management, Journal of the All India Management Association, December, 1984, Volume 23, No.12, PP 4–8 S P Parashar, Mehrotra Committee Report on Insurance Sector Reform in India – A Review, Indian Journal of Finance and Research, January 1994, Volume IV, No. 1, PP 81–88
S P Parashar, Privatisation: The Berlin- Chemie Way – A Case Study, Vision The Journal of the Management Development Institute, July–December 2000, Volume 4, No.2, PP 63–66
S P Parashar, Western Engineering Company Ltd. - When Two Worlds Collide-A Transfer Pricing Case, Chartered Accountant, Journal of the Institute of Chartered Accountants of India, May, 1997
S P Parashar, Evaluating Company Liquidity- A New framework, Chartered Accountant, Journal of the Institute of Chartered Accountants of India, November, 1984, Volume XXXIII, No.5, PP 403–408
S P Parashar, A New Look at Corporate Liquidity, Indian Management, Journal of the All India Management Association, May 1984, Volume 23, No. 5, PP 23–25
S P Parashar, Liquidity Management in Indian Industries- Sectoral Trends, Indian Economic Almanac, Journal of the Indian Economic Association, June, 1982
S P Parashar, Jackson Electric Company Ltd. -A Strategic Cost Management Case Analysis, Chartered Accountant, Journal of the Institute of Chartered Accountants of India, March, 1997
S P Parashar, "Operational Efficiency will be the Key Determinant of Success of Financial Institutions in the Next Century", Vision Journal of Management Development Institute, January–June, 1998
S P Parashar, Financial Reforms in India- Vision 2010, MAIMS Journal of Management, April 2006
S P Parashar, What kind of Management Control System Does National Thermal Power Corporation Need? Journal of the Institute of Public Enterprises, 1992

Other publications 
Book: S.P.Parashar, Liquidity Management, Principles & Practices of Managing Cash Flow, Vision Books, New Delhi, 1986.
Book: S P Parashar & Hassan Aboutahir, WTO Agreements on Financial Services- Implications for UAE Banks.
Book: Qasrawi Sophia / S.P.Parashar, Foreign direct investment strategic options for the UAE.
Book: S P Parashar, Indian Section in International Dictionary of Management by Hono Johannsen and G. Terry Page, Vision Books, New Delhi, 1983.
Book Chapter: Teaching of Financial Management in India- Retrospect and Prospect.
In the Book: Abraham and Bhushan (Ed.) Management Strategies for the Changing Scenario, Association of Indian Management Schools, 1993.
Book Chapter: Recent Developments in International Capital Markets- Implications for Corporate Financing in the Book: Gupta, et al. (Ed.) Corporate Financing- Emerging Options, Anmol, Delhi, 1991.
Case study: S P Parashar, Benchmarking for Quality in Distance Education- A Case Study of Management Programs of IGNOU (Indira Gandhi National Open University), in Koul (Ed.), Structure and Management of Open Learning Systems, IGNOU, 1995
S P Parashar, Nationals in Credit Head Positions in UAE Banks- A Survey.
S P Parashar, Z Score of UAE Companies.

References

External links 

Brief CV at Department of Public Enterprises Website

Indian expatriates in the United Arab Emirates
Indian expatriates in Bahrain
Faculty of Management Studies – University of Delhi alumni
Delhi University alumni
Living people
Year of birth missing (living people)